I'm Not Through Loving You Yet is the thirty-first studio album by American country music artist Conway Twitty.

Track listing

1974 albums
Conway Twitty albums